Python may refer to:

Snakes
 Pythonidae, a family of nonvenomous snakes found in Africa, Asia, and Australia
 Python (genus), a genus of Pythonidae found in Africa and Asia
 Python (mythology), a mythical serpent

Computing
 Python (programming language), a widely used programming language
 Python, a native code compiler for CMU Common Lisp
 Python, the internal project name for the PERQ 3 computer workstation

People
 Python of Aenus (4th-century BCE), student of Plato
 Python (painter), (ca. 360–320 BCE) vase painter in Poseidonia
 Python of Byzantium, orator, diplomat of Philip II of Macedon
 Python of Catana, poet who accompanied Alexander the Great
 Python Anghelo (1954–2014) Romanian graphic artist

Roller coasters
 Python (Efteling), a roller coaster in the Netherlands
 Python (Busch Gardens Tampa Bay), a defunct roller coaster
 Python (Coney Island, Cincinnati, Ohio), a steel roller coaster

Vehicles
 Python (automobile maker), an Australian car company
 Python (Ford prototype), a Ford prototype sports car

Weaponry
 Python (missile), a series of Israeli air-to-air missiles
 Python (nuclear primary), a gas-boosted fission primary used in thermonuclear weapons
 Colt Python, a revolver

Other uses
 Python (codename), a British nuclear war contingency plan
 Python (film), a 2000 horror film by Richard Clabaugh
 Monty Python or the Pythons, a British comedy group
 Python (Monty) Pictures, a company owned by the troupe's surviving members
 Python, a work written by philosopher Timon of Phlius

See also
 Pyton, a Norwegian magazine
 Pithon, a commune in northern France

Animal common name disambiguation pages